Bénédicte Augst (born 28 January 1968) is a retired French rhythmic gymnast.

She represented France in the individual rhythmic gymnastics all-around competition at the 1984 Olympic Games in Los Angeles. She was 21st in the qualification round and didn't advance to the final.

References

External links 
 Bénédicte Augst at Sports-Reference.com

1968 births
Living people
French rhythmic gymnasts
Gymnasts at the 1984 Summer Olympics
Olympic gymnasts of France
20th-century French women